Ernst Carel Bakker (16 April 1946 – 8 February 2014) was a Dutch politician, alderman and member of the Democrats 66 political party.  He served as a member of the House of Representatives from 1981 to 1982. He joined the Amsterdam City Council in 1990 before becoming a city alderman beginning in 1992. Bakker relocated to Hilversum in 1998 to become Mayor, a position he held until his retirement in 2011.

Bakker died on 8 February 2014 in Hilversum, at the age of 67.

References

External links
  Parlement.com biography

1946 births
2014 deaths
Aldermen of Amsterdam
People from Hellendoorn
Mayors in North Holland
People from Hilversum
Municipal councillors of Amsterdam
Members of the House of Representatives (Netherlands)
Democrats 66 politicians
20th-century Dutch people